Rafael "Rafinha" Betim Marti (born 23 November 1987 in Sao Paulo, Brazil) is a Brazilian footballer who played for Bovista Timor Leste  of the East Timor club Liga Futebol Amadora.

Maldives

Traded to New Radiant of the Maldivian Premier League from Portugal's SCU Torreense in 2015, Betim Marti was sacked alongside two other foreigners due to putting in what the club thought was a languorous performance in the 2015 POMIS Cup. Shortly after, the Brazilian forward joined T.C. Sports Club.

References

External links 

 at ZeroZero
 at Soccerway

Citizen AA players
Hong Kong Premier League players
Association football forwards
Living people
Brazilian expatriate footballers
New Radiant S.C. players
1987 births
Brazilian footballers
Expatriate footballers in Hong Kong
Footballers from São Paulo
Expatriate footballers in the Maldives
Expatriate footballers in Morocco
T.C. Sports Club players